Langon was a town near the boundary between ancient Elis and ancient Achaea. Although properly belonging to the Eleans, it appears in the territory of the Achaean city of Dyme, lying between that city and the frontiers of Elis. In 224 BCE, Spartan king Cleomenes III took Langon following his victory over Aratus of Sicyon and the Achaeans near Hecatombaeon.

References

Populated places in ancient Achaea
Populated places in ancient Elis
Former populated places in Greece
Lost ancient cities and towns